For C*-algebra in mathematics, a k-graph (or higher-rank graph, graph of rank k) is a countable category  with domain and codomain maps  and , together with a functor  which satisfies the following factorisation property: if  then there are unique  with  such that .

Aside from its category theory definition, one can think of k-graphs as a higher-dimensional analogue of directed graphs (digraphs). k- here signifies the number of "colors" of edges that are involved in the graph. 
If k=1, a k-graph is just an ordinary directed graph.
If k=2, there are two different colors of edges involved in the graph and additional factorization rules of 2-color equivalent classes should be defined. The factorization rule on k-graph skeleton is what distinguishes one k-graph defined on the same skeleton from another k-graph. k can be any natural number greater than or equal to 1.

The reason k-graphs were first introduced by Kumjian, Pask et al. was to create examples of C*-algebras from them. k-graphs consist of two parts: skeleton and factorization rules defined on the given skeleton. Once k-graph is well-defined, one can define functions called 2-cocycles on each graph, and C*-algebras can be built from k-graphs and 2-cocycles. k-graphs are relatively simple to understand from a graph theory perspective, yet just complicated enough to reveal different interesting properties at the C*-algebra level. The properties such as homotopy and cohomology on the 2-cocycles defined on k-graphs have implications to C*-algebra and K-theory research efforts. No other known use of k-graphs exist to this day; k-graphs are studied solely for the purpose of creating C*-algebras from them.

Background 
The finite graph theory in a directed graph form a category under concatenation called the free object category (generated by the graph). The length of a path in  gives a
functor from this category into the natural numbers .
A k-graph is a natural generalisation of this concept which was introduced in 2000 by Alex Kumjian and David Pask.

Examples 
 It can be shown that a 1-graph is precisely the path category of a directed graph.

Notation 
The notation for k-graphs is borrowed extensively from the corresponding notation for categories:
 For  let .
 By the factorisation property it follows that .
 If  for all  and  then  is said to be row-finite with no sources.

Visualisation - Skeletons 
A k-graph is best visualized by drawing its 1-skeleton as a k-coloured graph  where
from 
and  defined by 
if and only if  where  are the canonical
of degree  where  gives rise to relations between the edges of
.

C*-algebra 
As with graph-algebras one may associate a C*-algebra to a k-graph:

Let  be a row-finite k-graph with no sources then a Cuntz–Krieger  family in a C*-algebra B is a collection  of operators in B such that
   if ;
  are mutually orthogonal projections;
 if  then ;

 is then the universal C*-algebra generated by a Cuntz–Krieger -family.

References 

 

C*-algebras